Pilodeudorix zeloides, the midnight-blue playboy, is a butterfly in the family Lycaenidae. It is found in Uganda, western Tanzania, Malawi, Zambia, Mozambique and eastern Zimbabwe.

Adults feed from flowers. They are on wing from August to May.

The larvae feed on Parinari curatellifolia.

References

Butterflies described in 1901
Deudorigini